Lee Edelman (born 1953) is an American literary critic and academic. He serves as a professor of English at Tufts University. He is the author of four books.

Early life
Lee Edelman was born in 1953.  He graduated with a Bachelor of Arts degree from Northwestern University, and he received an MPhil and a PhD from Yale University.

Career
Edelman began his academic career as a scholar of twentieth-century American poetry. He has since become a central figure in the development, dissemination, and rethinking of queer theory. His current work explores the intersections of sexuality, rhetorical theory, cultural politics, and film. He holds an appointment as the Fletcher Professor of English Literature and has served as the Chair of the English Department. He gained international recognition for his books about queer theory, post-structuralism, psychoanalytic theory, and cultural studies.

Edelman is the author of three books. His first book, Transmemberment of Song: Hart Crane's Anatomies of Rhetoric and Desire, is a critique of Hart Crane's poetry. His second book, Homographesis: Essays in Gay Literary and Cultural Theory, explores the significance of gay literature. His third book, No Future: Queer Theory and the Death Drive, is a post-Lacanian analysis of queer theory.

Edelman's work has been contentious in queer theory, with José Esteban Muñoz's Cruising Utopia polemicizing against his "queer negativity." A 2005 Modern Language Association Conference held a special symposium on the subject, with participants Robert L. Caserio, Lee Edelman, Jack Halberstam, José Esteban Muñoz and Tim Dean debating the utility of the critique of reproductive futurism.

Personal life
Edelman is married to critic and fellow English professor Joseph Litvak.

Awards
2006 Lerman-Neubauer Award for Outstanding Teaching and Advising
2005 Named Fletcher Chair of English Literature
1998 Awarded the Distinguished Scholar Award by Tufts University
1994 Tufts Class of 1994 Recognition for Excellence
1993 Chosen by Alumni of Class of 1986 as one of Tufts' Most Influential Teachers
1989 Crompton-Noll Award of the MLA for "Redeeming the Phallus"
1989 Lillian and Joseph Leibner Award for Distinguished Teaching and Advising

Bibliography

Books 

Edelman, Lee (2023). Bad Education. Why Queer Theory Teaches Us Nothing. Durham, North Carolina: Duke University Press. ISBN 9781478018629

Selected Articles 
 
 A review of:

References

External links
 Faculty webpage

1953 births
American academics of English literature
Living people
Northwestern University alumni
Queer theorists
Tufts University faculty
Yale University alumni
Gay academics
LGBT Jews